Octagonal (8 October 1992 – 15 October 2016) was a champion New Zealand-bred, Australian raced Thoroughbred racehorse, also known as 'The Big O' or 'Occy'. He was by the champion sire Zabeel, out of the champion broodmare Eight Carat, who also produced Group One winners Mouawad, Kaapstad, Diamond Lover and (Our) Marquise.

Biography
Bob Ingham, along with brother Jack Ingham, purchased and raced Octagonal. Trained by John Hawkes, Octagonal made his debut late in 1994, and was crowned the Australian Champion Two Year Old on the strength of his autumn campaign, which comprised wins in the Todman Trial and AJC Sires Produce Stakes and close seconds in the STC Golden Slipper and AJC Champagne Stakes.

As a three-year-old, Octagonal won seven of his eleven starts, and took his record to 10 wins from 16 starts.  In addition to beating a high-standard crop in Sydney's three-year-old autumn triple crown - the Canterbury and Rosehill Guineas and the Australian Derby - Octagonal won the two richest weight-for-age races on the Australian calendar, the W. S. Cox Plate and the Mercedes Classic. With earnings of just short of A$4 million, Octagonal was voted the 1996 Australian Champion Three Year Old, Australian Horse of the Year, and remains the last horse to have won the triple crown. The Victoria (spring) and Australian Derby (autumn) double eluded him, however, as he was narrowly defeated by Nothin' Leica Dane in the Victoria Derby.

Octagonal returned to the track as a four-year-old, but his win the Underwood Stakes was the only highlight of a spring campaign that saw him unplaced in six of his seven starts. Meanwhile, the horses who had finished second to him in the triple crown - Saintly and Filante - won three races each, including the Epsom Handicap, the W. S. Cox Plate (where they were first and second), and the Melbourne Cup. Octagonal's final campaign, during the autumn, was more consistent, and featured Group One wins in consecutive starts in the Chipping Norton Stakes, Australian Cup, and the Mercedes Classic. At his final start, he was runner-up in the AJC Queen Elizabeth Stakes; a feat coincidentally emulated in the farewell of his champion son, Lonhro, seven years later.

Octagonal retired to stud after 28 starts with a record of 14 wins (10 Group 1), 7 seconds (6 in GI or GII races) and a third. He ended his racing career with a stakes tally of A$5,892,231, the highest of any galloper in Australasia to that point.

Octagonal stood at Cootamundra, New South Wales prior to his death. He is the sire of Australian Group One winning brothers Lonhro and Niello, the South African Group 1 winner, Suntagonal. In 1998, he stood at Haras du Quesnay in France where his most prominent offspring was Laverock whose wins include two Group 1 races: the Prix d'Ispahan at Longchamp Racecourse in Paris and the Gran Premio del Jockey Club at Milan, Italy's, San Siro Racecourse.

Octagonal was euthanized on 15 October 2016 at the age of 24 years at Woodlands Stud at Denman in the NSW Hunter Valley. He was buried next to his fellow stallion mate Canny Lad. Owner Bob Ingham described his career as 'heroic' and 'life-changing'.

Race record

Progeny
Octagonal's major race winners include:

Pedigree

See also
 Australian Champion Racehorse of the Year
 List of millionaire racehorses in Australia

References

External links
 Octagonal at Stallions.com.au
 Octagonal's pedigree and partial racing stats

1992 racehorse births
2016 racehorse deaths
Australian Champion Racehorse of the Year
Racehorses bred in New Zealand
Racehorses trained in Australia
Cox Plate winners
Triple Crown of Thoroughbred Racing winners
Australian Racing Hall of Fame horses
Thoroughbred family 9-c